The 1914 Hong Kong Sanitary Board by-election was held on 1 May 1914 for the one of the two unofficial seats in the Sanitary Board of Hong Kong. It was a by-election caused by the absence of F. B. L. Bowley from Hong Kong on holiday.

Overview
There were two candidates, P. W. Goldring, senior member of the Goldring and Russ solicitors firm and W. L. Carter, manager of the China and Japan Telephone and Electric Co., Ltd.. Goldring was proposed by E. J. Grist and seconded by Playfair while Carter was proposed by E. A. Hewett and seconded by H. E. Pollock.

The polling took place at the City Hall from 4 to 6 p.m. on 1 May 1914, presided by H. A. Nisbet, Registrar of the Supreme Court. With the inclement weather, only 175 persons of the around 1,200 voters showed up. Goldring was elected with the majority of 109 votes.

References

Hong Kong
1914 in Hong Kong
Sanitary
March 1914 events
1914 elections in the British Empire